The 2010 Davidson Wildcats football team represented Davidson College as a member of the Pioneer Football League (PFL) during the 2010 NCAA Division I FCS football season. The Wildcats were led by sixth-year head coach Tripp Merritt and played their home games at Richardson Stadium. They compiled an overall record of 3–8 with a mark of 3–5 in conference play, placing sixth in the PFL.

Schedule

References

Davidson
Davidson Wildcats football seasons
Davidson Wildcats football